Oskari Mantere's  cabinet was the 16th government of Republic of Finland. Cabinet's time period was from December 22, 1928 to August 16, 1929. It was a minority government. 
 

 

Mantere
1928 establishments in Finland
1929 disestablishments in Finland
Cabinets established in 1928
Cabinets disestablished in 1929